Gaia Girls is the title of the seven-book series of children's books by Lee Welles, published by Chelsea Green Publishing in Vermont. It focuses on the dying earth, personified as Gaia, and girls with the powers to control the elements.

The first book in the series, Enter the Earth, has won several awards, including the Independent Publisher Book Award for 2007.

Books 
There are currently two published books in the series.

Enter the Earth (2006) is about Elizabeth Angier, a girl who has just finished the fourth grade, who finds out that Harmony Farms, a factory farming company, is trying to buy her family's farm in upstate New York. She must drive them away with her new powers from Gaia, the Earth's entity represented as a talking otter.
Way of Water (2007) is about Miho, a young girl whose parents died "lost at sea." She must move to Japan to live with an uncle she has never met before. She must use her powers given to her by Gaia to save her new dolphin friends and convince her uncle to stay and live by the sea in Goji.
Air Apparent  (yet to be published)

References

Series of children's books
American children's novels
Children's fantasy novels
Environmental fiction books
2000s fantasy novels
Chelsea Green Publishing books